The lesser swamp warbler or Cape reed warbler (Acrocephalus gracilirostris) is an Old World warbler in the genus Acrocephalus. It is a resident breeder in Africa from the Democratic Republic of the Congo, the Chad and Ethiopia south to South Africa. This is a common species of reedbeds in standing water.

Description

The lesser swamp warbler is a plain-coloured smallish bird 14–16 cm long and weighing around 20 g. Its upperparts are rich brown, and it has a white supercilium. The underparts are white, with a rufous wash to the flanks. The long, strong bill has a slightly down-curved upper mandible; it is blackish-yellow with a yellower base. The legs are blue-grey and the eyes are brown. Adults of both sexes and juvenile birds are very similar in appearance.

The song is rich and melodious, a series of bubbly phrases that include trilling notes, cheerup chee trrreee and a large number of variations, with pauses between phrases.

Behaviour
The lesser swamp warbler builds a deep, firm cup nest from strips of reed blades, grass and sedges, which is lined with finer grasses. It is always placed in reeds above water. It nests mainly from August to December, with the earliest nesters being those in the winter rainfall areas of the Western Cape Province. It lays two or three brown eggs.  This species is monogamous, pairing for life.

The lesser swamp warbler is usually seen alone or in pairs, moving through wetland reedbeds, and clambering up and down reed stems. It eats insects and other small invertebrates.

Conservation status
This common species has a large range, with an estimated extent of 5,700,000 km². The population size is believed to be large, and the species is not believed to approach the thresholds for the population decline criterion of the IUCN Red List (i.e. declining more than 30% in ten years or three generations). For these reasons, the species is evaluated as Least Concern.

Subspecies
Acrocephalus gracilirostris includes the following subspecies:
 A. g. neglectus - (Alexander, 1908)
 A. g. tsanae - (Bannerman, 1937)
 A. g. jacksoni - (Neumann, 1901)
 A. g. parvus - (Fischer, GA & Reichenow, 1884)
 A. g. leptorhynchus - (Reichenow, 1879)
 A. g. winterbottomi - (White, CMN, 1947)
 A. g. cunenensis - (Hartert, 1903)
 A. g. gracilirostris - (Hartlaub, 1864)

Gallery

References

 Ian Sinclair, Phil Hockey and Warwick Tarboton, SASOL Birds of Southern Africa (Struik 2002) 
SASOL e-guide
Birds of Southern Africa

External links

 Lesser swamp warbler - Species text in The Atlas of Southern African Birds.

lesser swamp warbler
Birds of Southern Africa
Birds of Sub-Saharan Africa
lesser swamp warbler
lesser swamp warbler